Ron Yitzchok Eisenman (Hebrew: רון יצחק אייזנמן; born 1959) is an American Orthodox rabbi, teacher and author. The long-time rabbi of Congregation Ahavas Israel in Passaic, New Jersey, Eisenman is a professor at Lander College For Women (a division of Touro College), and a contributor to Mishpacha, a Jewish magazine. 

Eisenman has been outspoken in his support and defense of Orthodox sex abuse victims.

Early life 
Ron Yitzchok Eisenman was born to an Orthodox Jewish family in Brooklyn, New York, where he was also raised. After attending the Yeshivah of Flatbush high school, he studied at Yeshiva University (YU). In 1979, following his second year there, Eisenman traveled to Israel in order to study at Yeshivat Har Etzion, coming under the wing of its leader, Aharon Lichtenstein. Eisenman, who used to carry the rabbi's sefarim (books) for him to the shiur (class), later said that Lichtenstein was one of the unique individuals who left a profound impact on him.

Eisenman returned to the United States, where he received semikhah (rabbinic ordination — "Yoreh Yoreh") from Joseph B. Soloveitchik of YU, and "Yadin Yadin" from the Kollel L'dayanus of the Rabbi Isaac Elchanan Theological Seminary. He later went on to study at other yeshivas and kollelim in the United States and Israel.

Career 
In 1997, Eisenman was appointed as the rabbi of Congregation Ahavas Israel in Passaic, New Jersey. Under his leadership, the synagogue had grown to the point where it hosted forty minyanim (prayer groups) a day, catering to the needs of 250 families in 2009. With a following of approximately one quarter of Passaic's Jewish population, he was one of the most prominent rabbis in the city. Eisenman has taught at Bruriah High School and at Bais Yaakov. He teaches as a professor at Lander College For Women, a division of Touro College.

Eisenman is a popular columnist for Mishpacha, a Jewish magazine, and has authored several books. A prolific speaker, he acts as a scholar-in-residence.

In May 2021, Eisenman falsely characterized an Orthodox charity campaign as a scam that was connected to an interfaith organization. The error occurred because the name of the Jewish charity, the International Jewish Chesed Foundation (IJCF) pointed to the International Fellowship of Christians and Jews (IFCJ) when entered into a search engine. Eisenman also stated that his suspicion was aroused due to the location of the Jewish charity being in Delaware, apparently not aware of how that state's tax laws were attractive to non-profits. While he later issued an apology letter, he nevertheless abstained from endorsing the charity.

Advocacy for sexual abuse victims  
Soon after taking the pulpit in the late 1990s, Eisenman has been outspoken in his support and defense of Orthodox sex abuse victims. A self-proclaimed "anti-establishment" figure, and a "Maverick" to others, he organized a special panel in 2009 to address the issue, receiving pushback from some corners of the community. He has insisted that sexual abuse should be promptly reported to the police. In the wake of sexual assault allegations surrounding Haredi children's' author Chaim Walder, Eisenman published a strong letter condemning Walder, even encouraging people to throw his books out of the house. Eisenman's intention was to stave off any further emotional damage to Walder's  victims.

Personal life 
Eisenman lives with his family in Passaic. His married children live in New York and Israel.

Works 
 The Elephant in the Room: Torah, Wisdom, & Inspiration for Life (2012)
 For Everything a Time: A Journey Through the Year (2013)
 Shul with a View: A Rabbi's Personal Journal (2018)

References 

Living people
1959 births
American Orthodox rabbis
Rabbi Isaac Elchanan Theological Seminary semikhah recipients
Yeshivat Har Etzion
Orthodox rabbis